Jamie Smith (born 8 May 2002) is a Scottish professional footballer who plays for Hamilton Academical, as a goalkeeper.

Career
Smith began his career with Hamilton Academical, moving on loan to Rossvale in October 2020. He made his senior debut for Hamilton on 16 May 2021. He moved on loan to Broomhill in August 2021. On 16 February 2022, Smith joined East of Scotland League Premier Division side Blackburn United on loan for the remainder of the 2021–22 season. He was recalled by Accies on 25 February.

He has played for Scotland at under-17 level.

References

2002 births
Living people
Scottish footballers
Hamilton Academical F.C. players
Rossvale F.C. players
Broomhill F.C. (Scotland) players
Blackburn United F.C. players
Scottish Professional Football League players
Association football goalkeepers
Scotland youth international footballers